The 1998 Senior British Open was a professional golf tournament for players aged 50 and above and the 12th British Senior Open Championship, held from 6 to 9 August at Royal Portrush Golf Club in Portrush, County Antrim, Northern Ireland, United Kingdom.

In 2018, the tournament was, as all Senior British Open Championships played 1987–2002, retroactively recognized as a senior major golf championship and a PGA Tour Champions (at the time named the Senior PGA Tour) event.

Brian Huggett won in a playoff over Eddie Polland to win his first Senior British Open title and first senior major championship victory.

Venue
The event was the fourth Senior Open Championship in a row held at Royal Portrush Golf Club.

Field
113 professionals, no amateurs, entered the competition. One of them withdraw and one was disqualified. 61 players made the 36-hole cut.

Past champions in the field
Six past Senior British Open champions participated. All of them made the 36-hole cut.

Past winners and runners-up at The Open Championship in the field 
The field included three former winners of The Open Championship, Bob Charles (tied 9th), Gary Player (tied 12th) and Tony Jacklin (missed cut).

The field also included three former runners-up at The Open Championship; Brian Huggett (won), Neil Coles (tied 21st) and Christy O'Connor Snr (tied 41st).

Final round and playoff summaries

Final round
Sunday, 9 August 1998

Brian Huggett and Eddie Polland tied the lead after the fourth round, to meet in a sudden death playoff, to decide the winner. Brian Barnes birdied the 15th and 17th holes to move within a shot of the leaders and had a 20 foot putt on the 18th green to tie, but missed it and finished a shot from the playoff. Defending champion Gary Player finished tied 12th nine shots behind the leaders.

Playoff
Sunday, 9 August 1998

The sudden-death playoff went on the par-4 18th hole, to be played until one of the players had a lower score on the hole than the other. 61-year-old Brian Huggett beat Eddie Polland with a par at the first extra hole. Polland missed the green on the right side with his second shot and, after chipping in to the green, missed his putt from nine feet.

Sources:

References

External links 
 Results on European Tour website

Senior major golf championships
Golf tournaments in Northern Ireland
Senior British Open
Senior British Open
Senior British Open